The Other Woman is a studio album by country music artist Ray Price. It was released in 1965 by Columbia Records (catalog no. CS-9182).

The album debuted on Billboard magazine's country album chart on October 2, 1965, peaked at No. 3, and remained on the chart for a total of 38 weeks. The album included two Top 20 singles: "The Other Woman" (No. 2) and "Don't You Ever Get Tired of Hurting Me" (No. 11).

AllMusic gave the album four-and-a-half stars.

Track listing
Side A
 "The Other Woman (In My Life)" (Don Rollins) - 2:55
 "Don't You Ever Get Tired of Hurting Me" (Hank Cochran) - 2:42
 "After Effects (From Loving You)" (Hank Mills) - 2:27
 "Too Much Love Is Spoiling You" (Fred Carter Jr.) - 2:44
 "An Eye For an Eye" (Johnny Bush) - 3:10
 "Unloved, Unwanted" (Irene Stanton, Wayne P. Walker) - 3:16

Side B
 "Funny How Time Slips Away" (Willie Nelson) - 3:39
 "Born to Lose" (Frankie Brown) - 3:27
 "Just Call Me Lonesome" (Rex Griffin) - 2:25
 "This Cold War With You" (Floyd Tillman) - 2:56
 "Rose-Colored Glasses" (Fred Carter Jr.) - 2:15
 "The Last Letter" (Rex Griffin) - 3:13

References

1965 albums
Ray Price (musician) albums
Columbia Records albums